Middle Stack Mountain is a summit in the U.S. state of Nevada.

Middle Stack Mountain was so named on account of its central location between two other nearby mountains. A variant name is "Middlestack Mountain".

References

Mountains of Elko County, Nevada